Jaan Teemant's fourth cabinet was in office in Estonia from 19 February 1932 to 19 July 1932, when it was succeeded by Karl Einbund's first cabinet.

Members

This cabinet's members were the following:

References

Cabinets of Estonia